Pseudoxenodon karlschmidti, commonly known as the Chinese bamboo snake, is a species of snake in the family Colubridae. The species is found in China and Vietnam.

References

Pseudoxenodon
Reptiles described in 1928
Reptiles of China
Reptiles of Vietnam
Taxa named by Clifford H. Pope